Keepers of the Flame: Understanding Amnesty International is a book by the British political scientist Stephen Hopgood. The book examines the history, structure, and internal culture of the human rights organization Amnesty International. Published in 2006 by Cornell University Press, Keepers of the Flame received the Best Book on Human Rights award from the American Political Science Association the following year.

The book combines both a journalistic and an anthropological approach and is based on interviews, archival information, and participant observation carried out by Hopgood at Amnesty International in 2002–2003.

References

External links
Stephen Hopgood (7 June 2006). "Amnesty International: the politics of morality". openDemocracy (Hopgood outlines the main points arising from his research at Amnesty International and the basic thesis of Keepers of the Flame.)

Political science books
Amnesty International
Cornell University Press books
2006 non-fiction books